Rubus pumilus is an uncommon North American species of brambles in the rose family. It is native to the State of Chihuahua in northern Mexico.

Rubus pumilus is a perennial creeping along the surface of the ground, rooting at nodes, with prickles. Leaves are simple (not compound) usually with rounded blades but sometimes 3-lobed. Flowers are white. Fruit is red.

The genetics of Rubus is extremely complex, so that it is difficult to decide on which groups should be recognized as species. There are many rare species with limited ranges such as this. Further study is suggested to clarify the taxonomy.

References

pumilus
Plants described in 1874
Flora of Chihuahua (state)